Max Schuchart (16 August 1920 – 25 February 2005) was a Dutch journalist, literary critic and translator. He is most famous for translating the works of J. R. R. Tolkien into the Dutch language.

Life 

He was born on 16 August 1920 in Rotterdam.

He died in 2005 in The Hague.

Career 

His Dutch translation of the Lord of the Rings (In de Ban van de Ring) appeared in 1957 and was a resounding success, though Tolkien deeply disliked it, criticising its approach in a letter to his publisher Rayner Unwin.

He translated many other English authors into Dutch language. These include Oscar Wilde, Terry Goodkind, Richard Adams, Lord Dunsany, William Horwood, Daniel Defoe and Salman Rushdie.

Distinctions 

He has received the Martinus Nijhoff Prize.

In 1978, he received an MBE from Queen Elizabeth.

Bibliography 

Some of his books are:

 The Netherlands 
 Het zwaard van de waarheid  
 Steen der tranen 
 The Lord of the Rings (Dutch translation)
 The Hobbit (Dutch translation)

References

External links
 

1920 births
2005 deaths
Dutch literary critics
Dutch translators
English–Dutch translators
20th-century translators
20th-century Dutch journalists